The Adventures of Mighty Max is a video game developed by British studio WJS Design and published by Ocean Software for the Sega Genesis and Super Nintendo Entertainment System in 1994.

Gameplay
The Adventures of Mighty Max is a side-scrolling action game based on the cartoon series Mighty Max.

Reception

Next Generation reviewed the SNES version of the game, rating it one star out of five, and stated that "The sheer height of this game's creativity is that some stages have as much as three (count 'em, three) layers of scrolling in the background, and our tiny hero, Max, can stun his tiny enemies and pick them up to throw at other tiny enemies. Mighty Max is awful and no fun."

Electronic Gaming Monthly's  five-critic review crew gave the Genesis version of Mighty Max an average score of 4.8 out of 10, calling the game "incredibly slow" and 'unappealing'.

References

External links

1994 video games
Ocean Software games
Platform games
Sega Genesis games
Side-scrolling video games
Super Nintendo Entertainment System games
Video games based on animated television series
Video games developed in the United Kingdom